Runnin' Straight is a 1920 American short silent Western film directed by Arthur J. Flaven and featuring Hoot Gibson.

Cast
 Hoot Gibson
 Virginia Brown Faire
 Ted Brooks
 L. M. Wells
 C.E. Anderson credited as Captain Charles E. Anderson
 Rhea Haines

See also
 Hoot Gibson filmography

External links
 

1920 films
1920 Western (genre) films
1920 short films
American silent short films
American black-and-white films
Silent American Western (genre) films
1920s American films
1920s English-language films